S7 is an electrified commuter rail service operating between Floridsdorf and Vienna International Airport, with extended southbound service to Wolfsthal in the greater Vienna area and northbound service to Laa an der Thaya, sometimes ending in Wolkersdorf and Mistelbach. Between Wien Mitte and the airport, S7 provides local service on the route while the City Airport Train provides non stop express service to the airport. The S7 uses the former Aspangbahn right-of-way in the city center then, at Kledering, transitions to the former Pressburger Bahn, which connected Vienna and Bratislava, to Wolfsthal. Average travel time between Floridsdorf and Vienna International Airport is 37 minutes.

Route

The S7 uses the right of way of the former Aspang and Pressburger railways as well as the Vienna Trunk Line, in the city center. The line begins at Laa an der Thaya, far in the north of Lower Austria, then comes to Vienna, stopping at Wien Floridsdorf in Northern Vienna, cross the Danube on the Northern Railway Bridge, and continue along the Trunk Line to Wien Rennweg keeping just east of Vienna's historical city center. After Rennweg, the route diverges off the Trunk Line and transitions to the former Aspang Railway right of way. After passing Kledering marshalling yard, the route briefly connects to the Danube Overland Railway, via Flying junction. Past Wien Kaiserebersdorf, the route switches to the Pressburger railway, again via Flying Junction.

Public transport in Austria
Vienna S-Bahn